Tlaxiaco District is located in the south of the Mixteca Region of the State of Oaxaca, Mexico. The main city is the Heroic City of Tlaxiaco

Municipalities

The district includes the following municipalities:
 
Chalcatongo de Hidalgo
Magdalena Peñasco
San Agustín Tlacotepec
San Antonio Sinicahua
San Bartolomé Yucuañe
San Cristóbal Amoltepec
San Esteban Atatlahuca
San Juan Achiutla
San Juan Ñumí
San Juan Teita
San Martín Huamelulpam
San Martín Itunyoso
San Mateo Peñasco
San Miguel Achiutla
San Miguel El Grande
San Pablo Tijaltepec
San Pedro Mártir Yucuxaco
San Pedro Molinos
Santa Catarina Tayata
Santa Catarina Ticua
Santa Catarina Yosonotú
Santa Cruz Nundaco
Santa Cruz Tacahua
Santa Cruz Tayata
Santa María del Rosario
Santa María Tataltepec
Santa María Yolotepec
Santa María Yosoyúa
Santa María Yucuhiti
Santiago Nundiche
Santiago Nuyoó
Santiago Yosondúa
Santo Domingo Ixcatlán
Santo Tomás Ocotepec
Tlaxiaco

References

Districts of Oaxaca
Mixteca Region